Savyasachi may refer to:
 Savyasachi, an epithet of Arjuna, character from the Mahabharata
 Savyasachi (1995 film), a Kannada-language film
 Savyasachi (2018 film), a Telugu-language film